Seattle, Washington is home to four major art museums and galleries: the Frye Art Museum, Henry Art Gallery, Seattle Art Museum, and the Seattle Asian Art Museum. Several Seattle museums and cultural institutions that are not specifically art museums also have excellent art collections, most notably the Burke Museum of Natural History and Culture, which has an excellent collection of Native American artwork.

Seattle is also home to well over 100 commercial art galleries, at least a dozen non-profit art galleries, and perhaps a hundred artists' studios that are open to the public at least once a month. About half of these galleries and studios are concentrated in one neighborhood, Pioneer Square.

Museums

Defunct museums
 Consolidated Works, closed in 2006
Milepost 31, closed 2017, website, history of Pioneer Square and the construction of the Alaskan Way Viaduct replacement tunnel, featured model of Bertha (tunnel boring machine)
 Museum of Mysteries, closed in 2014, collections now online as the Northwest Museum of Legends and Lore
 Odyssey Maritime Discovery Center, closed in 2008
 Western Bridge, closed in 2012
 Wright Exhibition Space, closed in 2014, collections now at Seattle Art Museum

See also

 List of museums in Washington (state)
 The Seattle Aquarium is located on piers on the Elliott Bay waterfront; the Woodland Park Zoo on Phinney Ridge in north Seattle is one of the country's leading zoos, notable especially for its innovations in open and naturalistic zoo exhibits.
 The campus of Seattle Center includes the Pacific Science Center, Museum of Pop Culture, Chihuly Garden and Glass and the Seattle Children's Museum.

References

 
Seattle
Museums
Museums in Seattle
Museums